Dr Guido Gryseels is a Belgian academic and agricultural economist who has been Director-General of the Royal Museum for Central Africa in Tervuren, Belgium since 2001. Until the end of 2009, he was also the Chair of the Board of Trustees of the International Center for Agricultural Research in the Dry Areas (ICARDA), based in Aleppo, Syria. Gryseels, a Belgian national, joined as a member of ICARDA Board of Trustees in 2003 and, at the time, he took over as Board Chair in 2005 and replacing Margaret Catley-Carlson.

References

External links
Royal Museum for Central Africa page

Belgian economists
Living people
Belgian agriculturalists
Year of birth missing (living people)